Kryukov is a rural locality (a khutor) in Karayashnikovskoye Rural Settlement, Olkhovatsky District, Voronezh Oblast, Russia. The population was 79 as of 2010.

Geography 
Kryukov is located 19 km north of Olkhovatka (the district's administrative centre) by road. Karayashnik is the nearest rural locality.

References 

Rural localities in Olkhovatsky District